Tarmenkhan Babayev (born 8 January 2002) is an Azerbaijani weightlifter. He won the silver medal in the 85 kg event at the 2018 Summer Youth Olympics held in Buenos Aires, Argentina.

In 2018, he also won the gold medal in men's 94 kg event at the European Youth Weightlifting Championships held in San Donato Milanese, Italy.

References

External links 
 

Living people
2002 births
Place of birth missing (living people)
Azerbaijani male weightlifters
Weightlifters at the 2018 Summer Youth Olympics
21st-century Azerbaijani people